The following is a list of notable deaths in November 1994.

Entries for each day are listed alphabetically by surname. A typical entry lists information in the following sequence:
 Name, age, country of citizenship at birth, subsequent country of citizenship (if applicable), reason for notability, cause of death (if known), and reference.

November 1994

1
Noah Beery Jr., 81, American actor (The Rockford Files, Red River, Hondo), thrombosis.
Richard Krautheimer, 97, German art historian.
Elliot Lillico, 89, Australian politician.
Enrique Pérez, 97, Spanish rower.

2
David B. Feinberg, 37, American writer and AIDS activist, AIDS-related complications.
Grisha Filipov, 75, Bulgarian communist politician.
Harold Pearson, 86, English football player.
Richard Pottier, 88, Austrian-French film director.
Martin Taras, 80, American cartoonist.
Peter Matthew Hillsman Taylor, 77, American novelist, short story writer, and playwright.

3
Valter Palm, 88, Estonian boxer.
Archibald Stinchcombe, 81, English ice hockey player.
Peter Wilenski, 55, Australian public servant and ambassador, lymphatic cancer.
Ralph Walter Graystone Wyckoff, 97, American scientist and X-ray crystallography pioneer.

4
Ku. Ma. Balasubramaniam, 74, Indian writer and poet.
Sam Francis, 71, American artist, prostate cancer.
Onofrio Fusco, 75, Italian football player and manager.
Ashish Kumar Louho, 57, Bangladeshi film actor, playwright, dialogue writer and story writer.
Ermes Muccinelli, 67, Italian football player.
Fred Smith, 45, American musician, heart attack.

5
Patrick Dean, 85, British diplomat and ambassador.
Gene Desautels, 87, American baseball player.
Joe Hague, 50, American baseball player, cancer.
Johan Heyns, 66, South African theologian, homicide.
Tim McNamara, 95, American baseball player.
Milan Mladenović, 36, Serbian musician, pancreatic cancer.
William O'Brien, 76, Irish Fine Gael politician.
Albert Shesternyov, 53, Russian football player and manager, liver cirrhosis.
Frédéric Vandewalle, 82,  Belgian colonel and diplomat in the Belgian Congo.

6
Erv Dusak, 74, American baseball player.
Fernando de Santiago y Díaz, 84, Spanish politician and interim prime minister.
Dean Gallo, 58, American politician and businessman, prostate cancer.
Jørgen Johansen, 66, Danish football player.
Vladimir Zagorovsky, 69, Russian chess grandmaster.

7
Almer Hall, 81, English football player and manager.
Ebrahim Maka, 72, Indian cricket player.
Charles Mathiesen, 83, Norwegian speed skater.
Shorty Rogers, 70, American West coast jazz trumpeter, flugelhornist, and arranger, cancer.
Archie San Romani, 82, American middle-distance runner.
Dave Simmons, 51, American football player.
Carleton Young, 89, American actor, stroke.

8
Viktoria Dimitrova, 18, Bulgarian figure skater.
George Herring, 61, American gridiron football player.
Michael O'Donoghue, 54, American actor and writer, cerebrovascular disease.
Marianne Straub, 85, British textile designer.

9
Jim Brown, 85, American soccer player.
Erling Christophersen, 96, Norwegian botanist, geographer and diplomat.
Ralph Michael, 87, English actor (Empire of the Sun, Grand Prix, Compact).
Priscilla Morrill, 67, American actress (Santa Barbara, The Mary Tyler Moore Show, Newhart), kidney disease.
Richard Rust, 56, American actor (Sam Benedict), heart attack.

10
William Higinbotham, 84, American physicist.
Carmen McRae, 74, American jazz singer, stroke.
Louis Nizer, 92, American trial lawyer.
Zuleykha Seyidmammadova, 75, Azerbaijani female pilot.

11
Stephen Dykes Bower, 91, British church architect and Gothic Revival designer.
Ernest Clark, 82, British actor (Doctor in the House, The Dam Busters, Gandhi).
Dina Gralla, 89, German film actress (Madame Wants No Children).
Mikhail Krivonosov, 65, Soviet/Belarusian hammer thrower.
Kuvempu, 89, Indian poet, playwright, novelist and critic.
Elizabeth Maconchy, 87, Irish-English composer.
Bob Miner, 52, American businessman, mesothelioma.
Wanda Osiris, 89, Italian revue soubrette, actress and singer.
Christian Pravda, 67, Austrian alpine ski racer.
Rachel Saint, 80, American evangelical Christian missionary, cancer.
Caroline Smith, 88, American diver.
John Anthony Volpe, 85, American businessman, diplomat, and politician.
Dieter Wiedenmann, 37, German rower.
Pedro Zamora, 22, Cuban-American AIDS educator and television personality, AIDS-related complications.
Tadeusz Żychiewicz, 72, Polish journalist, art historian, publicist, and theologist.

12
Atanas Komchev, 35, Bulgarian wrestler and Olympic champion, traffic collision.
Onni Rajasaari, 84, Finnish long jumper and triple jumper.
Elmer Ernest Roper, 101, Canadian businessman, trade unionist and politician.
Wilma Rudolph, 54, American sprinter, brain cancer.
Soetjipto Soentoro, 53, Indonesian football player.
J. I. M. Stewart, 88, Scottish novelist and academic.

13
Mehrdad Bahar, 64, Iranist, linguist, mythologist and Persian historian.
Jack Baker, 47, American actor, bladder cancer.
Daniel Camargo Barbosa, 64, Colombian serial killer, stabbed.
John Bishop Harman, 87, British physician, aortic dissection.
Volodymyr Ivashko, 62, Soviet/Ukrainian politician.
Motoo Kimura, 70, Japanese biologist, cerebral hemorrhage.
Igor Platonov, 60, Soviet/Ukrainian chess player, homicide.

14
Humphry Berkeley, 68, British politician and author.
Nicholas Bianco, 62, American mobster and member of the Patriarca crime family, ALS.
René Konen, 73, Luxembourgish politician and government minister.
Dick Poillon, 74, American gridiron football player (Washington Redskins).
Francis Frederick Reh, 83, American Roman Catholic bishop.
Tom Villard, 40, American actor (We Got It Made, My Girl, Heartbreak Ridge), AIDS-related pneumonia.

15
Janet Ahlberg, 50, British children's writer and illustrator, breast cancer.
Pol Braekman, 74, Belgian sprinter.
Leandro Locsin, 66, Filipino architect, artist, and interior designer.
Elizabeth George Speare, 85, American writer of children's books, aortic aneurysm.
James W. Watts, 90, American neurosurgeon.

16
Eduard Kozynkevych, 45, Ukrainian football player.
Jim Poole, 79, American gridiron football player.
Chet Powers, 57, American singer-songwriter.
Doris Speed, 95, English actress (Coronation Street).

17
Theodore Robert Dudley, 58, American botanist, cancer.
Edgar Hennig, 97, American baseball player and American football coach.
Heinz-Georg Lemm, 75, German Bundeswehr general.
Mohammed Kadhim al-Qazwini, 64, Iranian-Iraqi Shia scholar, poet and orator.
Eddie Picken, 87, Early American basketball player.

18
Maurice Auslander, 68, American mathematician.
Ronaldo Bôscoli, 66, Brazilian composer, songwriter, record producer and journalist, prostate cancer.
Cab Calloway, 86, American jazz singer, dancer, bandleader and actor, stroke.
Nathan Fine, 78, American mathematician.
Anselm Franz, 94, Austrian jet engine pioneer.
Ruurd Dirk Hoogland, 72, Dutch-Australian botanist, explorer and naturalist.
Charles Hucker, 75, American historian.
Michael Somes, 77, English ballet dancer, brain cancer.
Herbert Taschner, 68, German film editor.

19
Erwin Griswold, 90, American lawyer.
Bipin Chandra Joshi, 58, 17th Indian Army officer and Chief of Staff.
Julian Symons, 82, British crime writer and poet.
Charles Umlauf, 83, American sculptor and teacher.

20
T. Carmi, 68, American-Israeli poet.
Tsuneari Fukuda, 82, Japanese dramatist, translator, and literary critic.
Jānis Krūmiņš, 64, Soviet-Latvian basketball player.
John Lucarotti, 68, British-Canadian screenwriter and author.
Lakshmi N. Menon, 95, Indian freedom fighter and politician.

21
Malcolm Adiseshiah, 84, Indian development economist and educator.
Thomas Kuchel, 84, American politician.
Pino Locchi, 69, Italian actor and voice actor.
Willem Jacob Luyten, 95, Dutch-American astronomer, heart failure.
Juancho Rois, 35, Colombian accordionist, plane crash.

22
Norma Donaldson, 66, American actress (The Young and the Restless, 9 to 5, Poetic Justice) and singer, cancer.
Minni Nurme, 77, Estonian writer.
Viola Spolin, 88, American theatre academic, educator and acting coach.
Charles Upham, 86, New Zealand soldier and recipient of the Victoria Cross.

23
Austen Albu, 91, British politician.
Art Barr, 28, American professional wrestler, heart attack caused by a drug overdose.
Erick Hawkins, 85, American modern-dance choreographer and dancer.
Irwin Kostal, 83, American film  musical arranger musical orchestrator
Garry Middleton, 46, Australian motorcycle speedway rider.
Alberto Natusch, 61, Bolivian general, cancer.
David Neves, 56, Brazilian film director and screenwriter.

24
Mohammad Ali Araki, 99, Iranian Grand Ayatollah.
Chet Benefiel, 87, American football and basketball coach.
Aleksandr Gusev, 39, Soviet/Russian field hockey player and Olympian.
Ivo Perilli, 92, Italian screenwriter, stroke.
George Douglas-Hamilton, 10th Earl of Selkirk, 88, Scottish nobleman and Conservative politician.
Milton Shapp, 82, American politician and governor of Pennsylvania, Alzheimer's disease.

25
Gheorghe Vitanidis, 65, Romanian film director.
Johanna von Trapp, 75, Austrian singer and member of the Trapp Family Singers, stroke.
John Charles Walker, 101, American agricultural scientist.
Irene Clark Woodman, 79, United States Army Nurse Corps officer.

26
Numa Andoire, 86, French football player and manager.
David Bache, 69, British automobile designer.
Magnus Cormack, 88, Australian politician.
Arturo Rivera y Damas, 71, Salvadoran Roman Catholic archbishop.
Bhalji Pendharkar, 97, Indian film director and producer.
Joey Stefano, 26, American pornographic actor, drug overdose.
Omer Vanaudenhove, 80, Belgian politician, mayor and minister.
José María Zaragoza, 81, Filipino architect.

27
Harald Christensen, 87, Danish cyclist.
Per Federspiel, 89, Danish politician.
Renate Haußleiter-Malluche, 77, German politician.
Tom Johnston, 75, Scottish football player and manager.
Fernando Lopes-Graça, 87, Portuguese composer, conductor and musicologist.
Rufina Nifontova, 63, Soviet/Russian theater and film actress.
Leonard Ravenhill, 87, English Christian evangelist and author.

28
Charles Howard, 12th Earl of Carlisle, 71, English nobleman, politician, and peer.
Jeffrey Dahmer, 34, American serial killer and sex offender, beaten to death.
Buster Edwards, 63, British criminal, suicide.
Franco Fortini, 77, Italian author, essayist, literary critic and Marxist intellectual.
Wolfgang Haack, 92, German mathematician and aerodynamicist.
Karl Kerbach, 76, Austrian football player.
Vic Legley, 79, French-Belgian violist and composer of classical music.
Al Levitt, 62, American jazz drummer.
Otilio Olguín, 63, Mexican swimmer and water polo player.
Ralph Olsen, 70, American football player (Green Bay Packers) and coach.
Frank Robbins, 77, American comic book artist and writer (Batman, Johnny Hazard, Superboy), heart attack.
Jerry Rubin, 56, American social activist, anti-war leader, and counterculture icon, traffic accident.
Ian Serraillier, 82, English novelist and poet.
Soulima Stravinsky, 84, Swiss-American pianist, composer and musicologist.
Vicente Enrique y Tarancón, 87, Spanish Roman Catholic cardinal.

29
William Tapley Bennett Jr., 77, American diplomat.
Harsh Uday Singh Gaur, 41, Indian military officer, killed in action.
Hervey Machen, 78, American politician. 
Titus Popovici, 64, Romanian screenwriter and author.
Charley Smith, 57, American baseball player.
George Bell Timmerman, 82, American politician and World War II veteran.

30
 Jesse Anderson, 37, American convicted murderer, beaten to death.
Guy Debord, 62, French Marxist theorist, philosopher, and filmmaker, suicide.
Louis Gabrillargues, 80, French football player.
Connie Kay, 67, American jazz and R&B drummer.
Lionel Stander, 86, American actor (Hart to Hart, A Star Is Born, The Transformers: The Movie), lung cancer.
Frederick H. Wagman, 82, American librarian.

References 

1994-11
 11